Yalçın Ünsal (born 1933) is a Turkish athlete. He competed in the men's long jump at the 1960 Summer Olympics.

References

1933 births
Living people
Athletes (track and field) at the 1960 Summer Olympics
Turkish male long jumpers
Olympic athletes of Turkey
Place of birth missing (living people)